Kathleen Doyle Bates (born June 28, 1948) is an American actor and director. Known for her roles in comedic and dramatic films and television programs, she has received various accolades throughout her career spanning over five decades, including an Academy Award, two Golden Globe Awards, two Screen Actors Guild Awards, and two Primetime Emmy Awards, in addition to nominations for a Tony Award and two British Academy Film Awards.

Born in Memphis, Tennessee, she studied theater at the Southern Methodist University before moving to New York City to pursue an acting career. She landed minor stage roles before being cast in her first on screen role in Taking Off (1971). Her first Off-Broadway stage performance was in the 1976 production of Vanities. Throughout the 1970s and early 1980s, she continued to perform on screen and on stage, and garnered a Tony Award nomination for Best Lead Actress in a Play in 1983 for her performance in 'night, Mother, and won an Obie Award in 1988 for her performance in Frankie and Johnny in the Clair de Lune. Her performance as Annie Wilkes in the tense psychological thriller Misery (1990) marked her Hollywood breakthrough, winning her the Academy Award for Best Actress. Further acclaim came for her starring roles in Fried Green Tomatoes (1991) and Dolores Claiborne (1995), and supporting roles in The Waterboy (1998) and Titanic (1997).

Bates received nominations for the Academy Award for Best Supporting Actress for her roles in Primary Colors (1998), About Schmidt (2002), and Richard Jewell (2019). Her television work has resulted in 14 Emmy Award nominations, including two for her leading role on the NBC series Harry's Law (2011–12). She won the Primetime Emmy Award for Outstanding Guest Actress in a Comedy Series for her appearance on the ninth season of Two and a Half Men (2012) and the Primetime Emmy Award for Outstanding Supporting Actress in a Miniseries or Movie for her portrayal of Delphine LaLaurie on the third season of American Horror Story (2013). She also received accolades for her portrayal of Miss Hannigan in the 1999 television adaptation of Annie. Her directing credits include several episodes of the HBO television series Six Feet Under (2001–03) and the television film Ambulance Girl (2005).

Early life
Bates was born in Memphis, Tennessee, the youngest of three daughters of mechanical engineer Langdon Doyle Bates and homemaker Bertye Kathleen (née Talbert). Her paternal grandfather was lawyer and author Finis L. Bates. Her great-great-grandfather, an Irish emigrant to New Orleans, Louisiana, served as President Andrew Jackson's doctor. She graduated early from White Station High School (1965) and from Southern Methodist University (1969), where she studied theater and became a member of the Alpha Delta Pi sorority. She moved to New York City in 1970 to pursue an acting career. Bates is an alumna of the William Esper Studio for the performing arts in Manhattan, New York City.

Career

Early work and success on stage (1970–1989)
After moving to New York City, Bates worked several odd jobs as well as minor stage roles while struggling to find work as an actress. At one point, she worked as a cashier at the Museum of Modern Art.

In 1971, Bates was cast in a minor role in the Miloš Forman comedy Taking Off (credited as "Bobo Bates"), her first on screen role in a feature film. Following this, she continued to struggle to find acting roles, later claiming in an interview with The New York Times that more than one casting agent told her that she wasn't sufficiently attractive to be a successful actress: "I'm not a stunning woman. I never was an ingenue; I've always just been a character actor. When I was younger it was a real problem, because I was never pretty enough for the roles that other young women were being cast in. The roles I was lucky enough to get were real stretches for me: usually a character who was older, or a little weird, or whatever. And it was hard, not just for the lack of work but because you have to face up to how people are looking at you. And you think, 'Well, y'know, I'm a real person.'"After Taking Off was released, Bates didn't work on another feature film until she appeared opposite Dustin Hoffman in Straight Time (1978). Throughout the 1970s, she continued to perform on stage. Her first Off-Broadway performance was in the 1976 production of Vanities. Bates subsequently originated the role of Lenny in the first production of Crimes of the Heart at the Actors Theatre of Louisville in 1979. Beginning in 1980, she appeared in Lanford Wilson's Fifth of July. In 1982, she starred in the Robert Altman-directed Come Back to the Five and Dime, Jimmy Dean, Jimmy Dean with Karen Black and Cher. During this time, she also began working in television, starring in a variety of soap operas such as The Doctors, All My Children, and One Life to Live, as well as making guest appearances in episodes of prime-time series such as The Love Boat, Cagney & Lacey, and St. Elsewhere in the late 1970s through mid-1980s.

The New York Times wrote that, in the early 1980s, Bates "established herself as one of America's finest stage actresses". In 1983, she was nominated for a Tony Award for Best Lead Actress in a Play for her role in the Pulitzer Prize-winning play 'night, Mother. The stage production ran for more than a year. She found further success on Off Broadway, in Terrence McNally's Frankie and Johnny in the Clair de Lune, for which she won an Obie Award for Best Actress in 1988. McNally specifically wrote the play for Bates. She later succeeded Amy Irving in the Off-Broadway production of The Road to Mecca in 1988. Around this time, she shifted her focus to screen acting, with roles in The Morning After (1986), and Summer Heat (1987).

Film breakthrough and critical success (1990–2009)

Bates' performance in the 1990 horror film Misery, based on the book of the same name by Stephen King, marked her Hollywood breakthrough. The film was a commercial and critical success and her performance as Annie Wilkes was met with widespread critical adulation. Also that year, she had a role in Warren Beatty's crime film Dick Tracy (1990). The following year, she won the Academy Award for Best Actress and the Golden Globe Award for Best Actress – Motion Picture Drama. The American Film Institute included Annie Wilkes (as played by Bates) in their "100 Heroes and Villains" list, ranking her as the 17th most iconic villain (and sixth most iconic villainess) in film history.

Soon after, she starred in the acclaimed 1991 film Fried Green Tomatoes, based on the novel by comedic actress Fannie Flagg. For her performance in this film, she received a BAFTA Award nomination. In 1995, Bates played the title character in Dolores Claiborne, another well-received Stephen King adaptation, for which she was nominated for Best Actress at the 22nd Saturn Awards.

In 1995, Bates began working behind the screen as well, as a director, on several television series; her early directing jobs include episodes of Great Performances, Homicide: Life on the Street, and NYPD Blue.

In 1996, Bates received her first Emmy Award nomination for Outstanding Supporting Actress in a Miniseries or a Movie, for her performance as Jay Leno's manager Helen Kushnick in HBO's The Late Shift (1996). That role also earned Bates her second Golden Globe Award win in the category of Best Supporting Actress – Series, Miniseries or Television Film and her first Screen Actors Guild Award for Outstanding Performance by a Female Actor in a Miniseries or Television Movie.

Bates gained wider recognition in 1997 when she portrayed Molly Brown in James Cameron's epic romance and disaster film Titanic, based on the sinking of the RMS Titanic in 1912. The film became the highest-grossing film of all time worldwide in 1998, and remained so for twelve years, until Avatar (2009), also written and directed by Cameron, surpassed it in 2010.

She received her second Academy Award nomination (and first in the Best Supporting Actress category) for her work as the acid-tongued political advisor Libby Holden in Primary Colors (1998), which was adapted from the book by political journalist Joe Klein. The following year, she was nominated for Outstanding Guest Actress in a Comedy Series for her work in the sitcom 3rd Rock from the Sun as well as for Outstanding Directing in a Miniseries or Movie for her work on the Dashiell Hammett-Lillian Hellman biopic Dash & Lilly. In 2000, Bates received another Emmy Award nomination for her turn as Miss Hannigan in Disney's remake of Annie (1999).

In 2002, she received her third Academy Award nomination, again in the Best Supporting Actress category, for performance as an aging free-spirited woman in About Schmidt, opposite Jack Nicholson. A scene in the film, which features Bates completely nude entering a hot tub, was noted by critics and received significant public attention. NPR called it "the scene everyone is talking about". Bates spoke about the scene in several interviews; speaking to Hello!, she said: "People either laugh or cheer ... I was at the premiere and there are a lot of women who are shouting, 'You go, girl!' ... I think there are a lot of women in the audience who are thrilled to see a real woman up on the screen in all her glory."Throughout the 2000s, Bates worked consistently in Hollywood cinema, often playing supporting roles in number of films, such as Rumor Has It... (2005), Failure to Launch (2006), P.S. I Love You (2007), The Day the Earth Stood Still (2008), and The Blind Side (2009). In 2006, she directed and co-starred in her feature film directorial debut Have Mercy (2006) with Melanie Griffith. In 2008, Bates re-teamed with her Titanic co-stars, Leonardo DiCaprio and Kate Winslet, in the romantic drama film Revolutionary Road.

During this time, she also appeared frequently on television. She starred in ten episodes of the HBO television drama series Six Feet Under, for which she received an Emmy Award nomination for Outstanding Guest Actress in a Drama Series in 2003. She also directed several episodes of the series. Bates received another Emmy Award nomination for Outstanding Lead Actress in a Miniseries or Movie, for Lifetime Television's film Ambulance Girl (2006), which she also directed.

Continued acclaim (2010–present)
In 2010, Bates appeared in the romantic comedy film Valentine's Day, directed by Garry Marshall. From 2010 to 2011, she had a recurring guest role on the NBC sitcom The Office as Jo Bennett. Her first lead role on a television series was in David E. Kelley's legal drama Harry's Law, which began airing on NBC on January 17, 2011, but was later canceled on May 14, 2012. In 2011, she portrayed famed art collector Gertrude Stein in Woody Allen's Midnight in Paris. In 2012, Bates made a guest appearance on Two and a Half Men as the ghost of Charlie Harper on the episode "Why We Gave Up Women", which aired on April 30, 2012. This guest appearance resulted in Bates winning her first Emmy Award, in the category of Outstanding Guest Actress in a Comedy Series, following nine nominations.

In 2013, she began starring in the American Horror Story series' third season, Coven, as Delphine LaLaurie, an immortal racist who is brought back into the modern world after spending years buried alive. For that role, she won her second Emmy Award, in the category of Outstanding Supporting Actress in a Miniseries or a Movie. Bates claimed that Ryan Murphy, the creator of the series, "resurrected [her] career".

Bates returned for the fourth season of American Horror Story, Freak Show, this time as Ethel Darling, a bearded lady who performs in a freak show. She subsequently returned again for the fifth season, Hotel, where she played Iris, the hotel's manager. Bates returned for her fourth, and the show's sixth season, Roanoke, playing two characters—Thomasin "The Butcher" White and Agnes Mary Winstead. She received further Emmy Award nominations for each season.

On September 20, 2016, Bates received a star on the Hollywood Walk of Fame for her work in the film industry. Her star is located at 6927 Hollywood Boulevard. In 2017, Bates starred in the Netflix television series Disjointed, in which she played the character of Ruth Whitefeather Feldman, an owner of a California medical marijuana dispensary. The show aired for two seasons.

In 2018, she appeared in two films: in Xavier Dolan's critically panned arthouse film The Death and Life of John F. Donovan and as political activist Dorothy Kenyon in the Ruth Bader Ginsburg biopic On the Basis of Sex. That year, she also guest-starred in the finale of the 11th season of the CBS sitcom The Big Bang Theory.

In 2019, Bates portrayed American politician Miriam A. Ferguson in the Netflix crime film The Highwaymen. She also starred in the Clint Eastwood biographical drama film Richard Jewell, playing the mother of the title individual. For her performance, she was nominated for a Golden Globe Award for Best Supporting Actress – Motion Picture, as well as her fourth Academy Award nomination (also in the Best Supporting Actress category).

In 2020, it was reported that Bates would be starring in an Irish drama film, The Miracle Club, with Maggie Smith and Laura Linney. The film's plot is being described as a "joyful and hilarious" journey of a group of riotous working-class women from Dublin, whose pilgrimage to Lourdes in France leads them to discover each other's friendship and their own personal miracles." She was cast in coming-of-age film Are You There God? It’s Me, Margaret a feature adaptation of Judy Blume’s novel of the same name, directed by Kelly Fremon Craig.

Reception and acting style

Since her universally acclaimed breakout role in Misery (1990), Bates has often been referred to by the media as one of America's most respected actresses.

She has been praised for her ability to portray a wide range of characters across genres and performing media. Bates ascribes this to her perceived lack of conventional beauty, which has allowed her to take on unconventional and interesting roles from the very beginning of her career. Derek Malcolm of The Guardian noted that Bates emerged as a new kind of a film actress unrestrained by the necessity to be glamorous, a standard that had hitherto been expected of female screen stars. Referring to her acting talent, Malcolm added that, "[Bates] is a fine actress who knows that less in the way of a ‘performance’ is often more and that strong moments have to be severely rationed." Roger Ebert suggested that her role of Annie Wilkes is a prime example of Bates' exceptional talent for versatility, commenting that she is "uncanny in her ability to switch, in an instant, from sweet solicitude to savage scorn".

In addition to commending Bates for her versatility, critics have pointed to her remarkable talent for making her characters believable, no matter how strange or unconventional their personality may be. Jacob Trussell of Film School Rejects notes how "truthful" Bates' performances are, observing that her ability to access a character's inner life enables her to "approach [them] from unique angles that can surprise even the writers who created them". 

Due to being theatrically trained, Bates tends to invest considerable time in studying the script, examining her given character's background, and rehearsing.

Personal life
As a teenager, Bates wrote self-described "sad songs" and struggled with bouts of depression. Bates was married to Tony Campisi for six years, from 1991 until their divorce in 1997. She is a member of the United Methodist Church and a registered Democrat.

Activism
In June 2016, the Human Rights Campaign released a video in tribute to the victims of the Orlando nightclub shooting; in the video, Bates and others told the stories of the people murdered there.

Health issues
Bates has battled ovarian cancer since her diagnosis in 2003. In September 2012, she revealed via Twitter that she had been diagnosed with breast cancer two months earlier and had undergone a double mastectomy. In 2014, at the New York Walk for Lymphedema & Lymphatic Diseases, Bates announced via pre-recorded audio that, due to the double mastectomy, she has lymphedema in both arms. That year, Bates became a national spokesperson for lymphedema and chairperson for the Lymphatic Education & Research Network's (LE&RN) honorary board.

On May 11, 2018, Bates led advocates in a Capitol Hill Lobby Day to garner congressional support for further research funding. The next day, May 12, Bates addressed supporters at the first-ever DC/VA Walk to Fight Lymphedema & Lymphatic Diseases at the Lincoln Memorial. She was awarded the 2018 WebMD Health Heroes "Game Changer" Award for her role in raising awareness of this chronic lymphatic disease.

Filmography and awards

Prominent in the industry since the early 1960s, Bates has had roles in several films and television projects, including:
Straight Time (1978)
The Morning After (1986)
Men Don't Leave (1990)
Dick Tracy (1990)
White Palace (1990)
Misery (1990)
At Play in the Fields of the Lord (1991)
Fried Green Tomatoes (1991)
The Road to Mecca (1991)
A Home of Our Own (1993)
Angus (1995)
Dolores Claiborne (1995)
Titanic (1997)
Primary Colors (1998)
The Waterboy (1998)
Annie (1999)
About Schmidt (2002)
Ambulance Girl (2005)
Charlotte's Web (2006)
Failure to Launch (2006)
The Family That Preys (2008)
The Blind Side (2009)
The Office (2010–2011)
Harry's Law (2011–2012)
Midnight in Paris (2011)
American Horror Story anthology series (2013–2018)
American Horror Story: Coven (2013–2014)
American Horror Story: Freak Show (2014–2015)
American Horror Story: Hotel (2015–2016)
American Horror Story: Roanoke (2016)
American Horror Story: Apocalypse (2018)
When Marnie Was There (2014)
Tammy (2014 film)
The Boss (2016)
Bad Santa 2 (2016)
On the Basis of Sex (2018)
Richard Jewell (2019)

Bates' several screen and stage credits have garnered her various acclaim and accolades, including nominations for four Academy Awards: Best Actress for her role as Annie Wilkes in the psychological thriller film Misery; and Best Supporting Actress for her roles in Primary Colors, About Schmidt and Richard Jewell. In 1991, she won Best Actress for her role in Misery. She is also a 14-time Emmy nominee; having won Outstanding Guest Actress in a Comedy Series in 2012 for Two and a Half Men and Outstanding Supporting Actress in a Limited Series or Movie in 2014 for American Horror Story: Coven. In addition to her 1991 win for Misery, Bates also received a Golden Globe trophy for her supporting role in the television film The Late Shift (1996), for which she also received a SAG Award in the same category. This was followed by a 1999 win for Outstanding Performance by a Female Actor in a Supporting Role for her role in Primary Colors. In 1983, she was nominated for the Tony Award for Best Actress in a Play for her role in a 1983 production of 'night, Mother.

A nominee for the Triple Crown of Acting, she is one of few performers to be nominated in acting categories for one Tony Award, four Academy Awards, and 14 Emmy Awards; the first of each being listed below:
37th Tony Awards: Best Performance by a Leading Actress in a Play (1983)
63rd Academy Awards: Best Actress in a Leading Role, win, for Misery (1990)
48th Primetime Emmy Awards: Outstanding Supporting Actress in a Miniseries or Movie, nomination, for The Late Shift (1996)

See also
List of female film directors
List of women with ovarian cancer
List of breast cancer patients by survival status
List of actors with two or more Academy Award nominations in acting categories
Triple Crown of Acting

Notes

References

External links

1948 births
20th-century American actresses
21st-century American actresses
Actresses from Memphis, Tennessee
American film actresses
American women film directors
American people of Irish descent
American soap opera actresses
American stage actresses
American television actresses
American television directors
American voice actresses
Best Actress Academy Award winners
Best Drama Actress Golden Globe (film) winners
Best Supporting Actress Golden Globe (television) winners
Emmy Award winners
Film directors from Tennessee
Living people
Outstanding Performance by a Female Actor in a Miniseries or Television Movie Screen Actors Guild Award winners
Outstanding Performance by a Female Actor in a Supporting Role Screen Actors Guild Award winners
Outstanding Performance by a Supporting Actress in a Miniseries or Movie Primetime Emmy Award winners
Primetime Emmy Award winners
Southern Methodist University alumni
American women television directors
William Esper Studio alumni
Methodists from Tennessee
California Democrats
Tennessee Democrats